The 2014 Atlantic Coast Conference women's basketball tournament was the postseason women's basketball tournament for the Atlantic Coast Conference, held March 5–9, 2014, in Greensboro, North Carolina, at the Greensboro Coliseum. This was the first ACC Tournament to include 15 teams, a result of the conference adding Syracuse, Pitt, and Notre Dame, and also the last to involve Maryland, which will leave the ACC in July 2014 to join the Big Ten Conference.

Seeds

Schedule

Bracket

OT denotes overtime game

Awards and honors
Tournament MVP: Jewell Loyd, Notre Dame

All-Tournament teams:

First Team
 Jewell Loyd, Notre Dame
 Kayla McBride, Notre Dame
 Elizabeth Williams, Duke
 Tricia Liston, Duke
 Diamond DeShields, North Carolina

Second Team
 Natalie Achonwa, Notre Dame
 Haley Peters, Duke
 Dearica Hamby, Wake Forest
 Natasha Howard, Florida State
 Alyssa Thomas, Maryland

See also
 2014 ACC men's basketball tournament

References

2013–14 Atlantic Coast Conference women's basketball season
ACC women's basketball tournament
Basketball competitions in Greensboro, North Carolina
Women's sports in North Carolina
2014 in sports in North Carolina